Joanna Elizabeth Killian (born June 1965) is a local government official, who has been Chief Executive of Surrey County Council since March 2018.

A graduate of Keele University, she was Chief Executive of Essex County Council from 2006 to 2015, and worked at KPMG prior to being appointed Chief Executive of Surrey County Council.

Appointed Chair of Trustees of St Mungo's (charity) (Homeless Charity) in September 2021.

References

1965 births
Living people
Alumni of Keele University